Paracotalpa puncticollis is a beetle of the family Scarabaeidae.

Images

References 

Scarabaeidae
Beetles described in 1863